Liu Junxian (born 25 January 2001) is a Chinese footballer currently playing as a forward for Wuhan.

Career statistics

Club
.

Notes

References

2001 births
Living people
Chinese footballers
China youth international footballers
Association football forwards
Campeonato de Portugal (league) players
China League Two players
Chinese Super League players
Shandong Taishan F.C. players
F.C. Vizela players
Juventude de Pedras Salgadas players
Wuhan F.C. players
Chinese expatriate footballers
Chinese expatriate sportspeople in Portugal
Expatriate footballers in Portugal